Nina Bednarik (born March 12, 1982 in Škofja Loka) is a Slovenian freestyle skier, specializing in Moguls .

Bednarik competed at the 2006 and 2010 Winter Olympics for Slovenia. Her best finish was in 2006, when she placed 24th in the qualifying round of the moguls, failing to advance. In 2010, she placed 26th in the qualifying round of the moguls, again failing to advance.

As of April 2013, her best showing at the World Championships is 9th, in the dual moguls event in 2005 .

Bednarik made her World Cup debut in December 2001. As of April 2013, her best World Cup event finish is 17th place, in a moguls event at Spindelruv Mlyn in 2005/06. Her best World Cup overall finish in moguls is 28th, in 2004/05.

References

1982 births
Living people
Olympic freestyle skiers of Slovenia
Freestyle skiers at the 2006 Winter Olympics
Freestyle skiers at the 2010 Winter Olympics
People from Škofja Loka
Slovenian female freestyle skiers